Sequestered is an American streaming television series created by Aaron Tracy, airing via online streaming video service Crackle. The first six episodes were released online on August 5, 2014, and the second set of six episodes were released on October 14. The show is no longer available on the Crackle service although it is still on Netflix.

Plot 
The series follows the trial of Malcolm Miller, a man accused of kidnapping and murdering the governor's young son. A jury is sequestered in a hotel where it has to decide Miller's fate, while his young lawyer Danny Firmin starts to put together what seems to be pieces of a conspiracy. Anna, one of the jurors who believes in Miller's innocence, is soon threatened.

Cast 
 Jesse Bradford as Danny Firmin
 James Maslow as Kevin Mohr
 Bruce Davison as Danny Firmin's father
 Chris Ellis as Ron Pritchard
 Patrick Warburton as Mark Bennett
 Dina Meyer as Helen Bennett
 Trevor Torseth as Hugh Cross
 Brooke Wexler as Jenny Brandt

Jurors 
 Summer Glau as Anna Brandt
 Ryan McPartlin as Ryan
 Rhonda Aldrich as Yvonne
 Lindsay Bushman as Kaitlyn
 Heather Dubrow as Marisa
  Chem Ehelepola as Ramesh
  Robert Elzein as Stone
 Christopher Goodman as Charles
  Brian Ibsen as Judd
 Emily Kuroda as Rufang
 Dan Mott as Seth
 Duane Shepard as Vernon

Episodes

Awards and nominations

References

External links

2010s American crime television series
2014 American television series debuts
2014 American television series endings
Crackle (streaming service) original programming
American crime television series
English-language television shows
Television shows set in Los Angeles